Latkowo may refer to the following places:
Latkowo, Inowrocław County in Kuyavian-Pomeranian Voivodeship (north-central Poland)
Latkowo, Radziejów County in Kuyavian-Pomeranian Voivodeship (north-central Poland)
Latkowo, Pomeranian Voivodeship (north Poland)